"The Friar's Club" is the 128th episode of NBC sitcom Seinfeld. This is the 18th  episode for the seventh season, originally airing on March 7, 1996. In this episode, Jerry jeopardizes his chances of becoming a member of the New York Friars' Club when he accidentally takes a club jacket home with him, George hopes to spend more time with Jerry by fixing him up with his fiancé Susan's best friend, and J. Peterman saddles Elaine with the workload of her hard-of-hearing co-worker.

Plot
Due to a mixup by the caterers, George's wedding is delayed until June. He sets Jerry up with Susan's best friend Hallie so that he and Jerry can double date. At their first double date at the Friars Club, Jerry doesn't wear a jacket so the club loans him one with a crest. Jerry accidentally leaves with the one the club loaned him. Kramer borrows it without permission, gets it dirty, and takes it to the cleaners. Jerry is unable to return it before a second double date, this time at the Flying Sandos Brothers magic show. As part of the act, one of the performers takes the jacket and throws it into the audience. Hallie says that she will bring the jacket back but Jerry thinks she wasn't too concerned about the jacket.

J. Peterman hires a partially deaf man, Bob Grossberg. Bob conveniently cannot hear whenever he is assigned work, and Peterman passes his load on to Elaine. Elaine suspects Bob is faking, and tests him by professing sexual attraction to him. Peterman overhears and gives them tickets to the Flying Sandos Brothers. Elaine is pressured to attend by her boss, who suspects her remarks to Bob were not sincere and she was making fun of his handicap.

Kramer tries polyphasic sleep, which causes him to be restless during his nighttime waking hours and fall asleep on his girlfriend Connie during a make-out session. She thinks he is dead, and calls some friends to take him away so that her mobster boyfriend will not know she was cheating on him. Kramer is dumped into the Hudson River, which shocks him awake. After surfacing, he tells the police Connie tried to kill him. She calls her lawyer, Jackie Chiles, but he refuses to take the case when he hears Kramer is involved.

Jerry is told he owes $800 and will no longer be under consideration for Friars Club membership if he fails to return the jacket. At the Friars Club, Jerry and George spot a Flying Sandos Brother wearing a jacket. They follow and rip it from his hands, but realize that the jacket has a different crest. Hallie witnesses this just before returning the real Friars Club jacket to Jerry, and loses interest in their double dating. Bob forces himself on Elaine at the show; she shoves him off and he accidentally drops his hearing aid. Elaine takes the opportunity to try it on. The magicians chase Jerry and George backstage to recover their jacket, through the emergency exit, which sounds the alarm. The noise is amplified by the hearing aid, causing Elaine great pain.

Production
Writer David Mandel got the idea for the Bob Grossberg story from a boy he knew in high school who wore a hearing aid and would pretend that he couldn't hear whenever he was asked a question he didn't know the answer to. Rob Schneider was the first person to come to Mandel's mind for the part of Grossberg, since he had worked with Schneider on Saturday Night Live and had unsuccessfully tried to cast him as Ramon in "The Pool Guy".

The scenes at the Flying Sandos Brothers shows were filmed at the Orpheum Theatre. Kramer waking up inside the Hudson River was filmed in a Universal Studios water tank, with weights loaded inside the burlap sack to make it sink as rapidly as it would be expected to if dropped from the bridge over the river. Due to the dangerous nature of the stunt, Michael Richards was given a small oxygen mask which he concealed inside his clothes, and two professional scuba divers were present in the tank. Richards, a certified diver, did not need the oxygen mask in either of the scene's two takes.

Jerry and George's dialogue about being "soured" and "sweetening" was added by Seinfeld creators Larry David and Jerry Seinfeld.

The script for "The Friar's Club" was extremely long even by Seinfeld standards, so numerous sequences had to be removed during editing. The opening scene (in which Susan tells George about the wedding delay and Hallie's breakup) and the ending scene (in which Peterman, after hearing Bob complain about the date, rebukes Elaine and sends Bob on a trip to Italy that he'd originally intended for her) were both cut in their entirety. Other sequences which were filmed but deleted include Peterman telling Elaine the story of how he fornicated with an ugly beekeeper, a much longer take of the double date during which Pat Cooper approaches Jerry, and George and Susan discussing how well Jerry and Hallie are getting along.

References

External links 
 

Seinfeld (season 7) episodes
1996 American television episodes
Television episodes written by David Mandel